Byron D. Benson was a steam tanker built in 1920–1921 by Oscar Daniels Shipbuilding Co. of Tampa for Tide Water Oil Co., a subsidiary of Standard Oil, with intention of operating between New York and oil-producing ports of the southern United States and Mexico. The ship was named after Byron D. Benson, founder of Tide Water Pipe Co.

Design and Construction
Early in 1920 Tide Water Oil Co. decided to add another tanker to expand their fleet of four vessels operating between the southern oil ports and New York and New Jersey. The contract for the new vessel was awarded to the Oscar Daniels Shipbuilding Co. and the ship was laid down at the shipbuilder's yard in Tampa (yard number 11) on 29 June 1920, and launched on 15 September 1921, with Miss Jane Benson of New York, granddaughter of Byron D. Benson, serving as the sponsor. The ship was built on the Isherwood principle of longitudinal framing providing extra strength to the body of the vessel, had two main decks and a shelter deck. Byron D. Benson had electric lights installed along the decks, and was also equipped with wireless of De Forest type.

The sea trials were held on 12–13 January 1922 in the Gulf of Mexico off Tampa during which the steamer performed satisfactorily and was able to exceed her contract speed.  Following an inspection, the steamer was transferred to her owners and departed for an oil storage site of Puerto Lobos, near Tamiahua, in ballast on January 28.

Operational history
After completion of sea trials the tanker was transferred to her owners and departed for her maiden trip on January 28, 1922 to Puerto Lobos, a large oil storage facility on the Mexican Gulf coast. Byron D. Benson continued carrying crude oil between the Mexican ports of Puerto Lobos, Tuxpan and Tampico and New York through the end of September. Following a decline in the production of Mexican oilfields around that time, the tanker along with many other vessels, was rerouted to carry oil from Californian oilfields instead. The tanker passed through the Panama Canal on October 30 on her first trip to San Pedro and again on her return journey on November 24 with 12,000 tons of oil destined for New York. The tanker continued sailing on the California to New York route through mid 1928, with occasional trips to and from Galveston. For example, she made six round-trip journeys between August 1924 and July 1925 season each time carrying between 10,000 and 12,000 tons of crude oil on her eastward trips. During the first six months of 1927 she was briefly put on the Gulf coast to New York route, carrying oil from ports of Galveston, Texas City and Baytown to New York and New Jersey. In June 1928 the tanker was chartered for one trip to Asia, carrying 11,386 tons of crude oil from Houston to Yokohama.

Following her return from Japan Byron D. Benson was reassigned to the Gulf to New York route carrying crude oil from the terminals of Magnolia Petroleum Company in Beaumont and Sinclair Oil Corporation and Texas Company in Port Arthur to the refineries in the Northeast ports of New York and Philadelphia, including Tidewater Oil own refinery in Bayonne. The vessel continued serving that route, as well as transporting crude and fuel oil from Houston to the ports of the Northeast through the remainder of her career.

On January 10, 1942 Byron D. Benson was returning from Port Arthur to Bayonne when around 19:30 in foggy weather she rammed Canadian coastal freighter Continent four miles south of Scotland Lightship, off New Jersey coast. The  vessel quickly filled with water and sank, leaving her entire fourteen men crew in icy waters. The tanker stood by for two hours and was able to rescue all but one of the crew men before landing them at Staten Island. The ship received only slight damage and could continue her operations.

Sinking
 
Byron D. Benson departed Port Arthur on March 27, 1942 for Bayonne transporting 91,500 barrels of crude oil. The vessel was under command of captain John MacMillan and had a crew of eight officers and twenty nine men. During the night of April 4, 1942 as the convoy slowly moved north along the coast at approximately  it was spotted and followed by German submarine . The explosion sent crude oil several hundred feet up in the air, and it started pouring out with the fire spreading rapidly. The panic spread among the crew as it started quickly abandoning the burning vessel but failing to shut down the engines in the process. Due to the loss of all starboard side lifeboats, only two port side lifeboats were launched. One, containing the captain and nine other men, drifted into flames and was never seen again. The men in the second boat were rescued by Hamilton, while Norwich City picked up a lone man clinging to a raft. All survivors were safely landed in Norfolk, but because of the running engines Byron D. Benson continued moving and burning for the next three days before finally sinking on 8 April in an approximate position .

References

Ships built in Tampa, Florida
Tankers of the United States
1921 ships
Oil tankers
Maritime incidents in April 1942
Ships sunk by German submarines in World War II
Shipwrecks of the United States
Shipwrecks of the Carolina coast
Ships built by the Oscar Daniels Shipbuilding Company